Moshe "Mutzi" Leon (born January 9, 1944) is a former Israeli international footballer of Bulgarian descent. Leon is regarded as the greatest player in the history of Maccabi Jaffa, there he played for over 20 seasons.

On June 3, 1964, He scored the first goal in the final game of the 1964 AFC Asian Cup, whom Israel won 2–1 against South Korea.

In 1998, he was introduced into the "Israeli Football Hall of Fame".

In 2008, in Israel's 60th anniversary, he was chosen by the Israeli Football Association as "The Best Left-back in Israel's History".

Honours
AFC Asian Cup
Winner (1): 1964
Israeli Premier League
Runner-up (3): 1961–62, 1963–64, 1976–77
Liga Artzit
Winner (1): 1970–71

References

Footnotes

1944 births
Living people
Bulgarian Jews in Israel
Bulgarian emigrants to Israel
Israeli footballers
Association football defenders
Maccabi Jaffa F.C. players
Israel international footballers
1964 AFC Asian Cup players
AFC Asian Cup-winning players
Israeli expatriate footballers
Expatriate soccer players in South Africa
Israeli expatriate sportspeople in South Africa
Footballers from Jaffa
Israeli Football Hall of Fame inductees